Musharraf Hussain  is a British-Pakistani born scientist, educator and religious scholar in Nottinghamshire, United Kingdom.

Biography

Musharraf Hussain is the Chief Executive of the Karimia institute Nottingham, an author and the Chief Editor of The Invitation, a Muslim family magazine. Musharraf is also a senior trustee of Muslim Hands, an international charity working in over 50 countries.

He trained and worked as a research scientist before becoming a full-time imam and an Islamic teacher. From 2000 to 2003, he was the vice-chairman of the Association of Muslim schools.

In September 2004, he and Daud Abdullah flew to Iraq, where they appealed to the captors to release British hostage Ken Bigley. In 2005, Hussain received an honorary degree from Staffordshire University.

In 2006, he was appointed by the Prime Minister to chair the UK-Indonesian Islamic advisory group, they were tasked to advise the government on countering radicalism and promoting mutual trust. From 2008 to 2010, he was the chairman of the Christian Muslim forum.

In 2019, he was awarded the 'Iman wa Amal' Special Award by The Muslim News for his translation of the Quran.

Books

See also 
 Rank Nazeer Ahmed
 Ali Ünal
 Ahmed Hulusi
 Nurettin Uzunoğlu

References

External links
 Karimia Institute
 Invitation Magazine
 Biography
 The Majestic Quran

1958 births
Living people
Pakistani scientists
Pakistani educators
Pakistani emigrants to the United Kingdom
Pakistani Muslims
Deputy Lieutenants of Nottinghamshire
Officers of the Order of the British Empire
Islamic scholars in the United Kingdom
Translators of the Quran into English